The sport of association football in the country of Saint Kitts and Nevis is run by the St. Kitts and Nevis Football Association. The association administers the national football team, as well as the SKNFA Super League and the N1 League (inactive since 2010). It is the most popular sport in the country. The national team has had limited international success.

League system

References